XHPMAS-FM and XHPNAV-FM are radio stations broadcasting on 100.5 MHz in Guaymas and 89.7 MHz in Navojoa, Sonora, owned by the Expreso newspaper. The stations form a simulcast known as Sonora Grupera, carrying a grupera format.

XHPMAS transmits from a tower atop Cerro El Vigía, while XHPNAV broadcasts from Cerro Prieto.

History
Medios y Editorial de Sonora initially won two stations, one each in Guaymas and Navojoa, in the IFT-4 station auction of 2017. This included XHPMAS, which cost 11 million pesos. XHPNAV was subsequently won after the initial winning bidder for the frequency dropped out, with a winning bid of 5.5 million pesos.

The stations signed on at the end of August 2018 in a simulcast.

References

Radio stations in Sonora
Radio stations established in 2018
2018 establishments in Mexico